Kong Zhou (103–163, Mandarin Chinese: 孔宙, "Pinyin Kǒng Zhòu") was the 20th lineal descendant of Confucius.  He was also the father of Kong Rong.  Kong Zhou had served as captain (都尉) of Mount Tai Commandery.

References

163 deaths
103 births